The Naul Hills, or Man-of-War Hills  are low-lying hills in north County Dublin, Ireland, close to the village of Naul, formerly called The Naul,. They lie beside the County Meath border, 30 kilometres north of  Dublin City (17 km north of the airport), 16 km north-northwest of Swords, and 8 km southwest of Balbriggan. 

Typical hill elevations run between 140 and 150 metres, with the highest point in the area being the 176m Knockbrack. Limestone quarrying has been carried out in the hills, and the London Encyclopaedia (1829) remarked, "there are coals at Naul...but the coal vein is not worked."

As a result of the COVID-19 pandemic, the temporary reduction in emissions as well as a period of sustained fine weather meant that Knockbrack was visible across the Irish Sea from Anglezarke, Lancashire for a period in May 2020.

References

See also

 Naul, Dublin
 List of mountains in Ireland

Mountains and hills of Fingal